Turbonilla toyatani is a species of sea snail, a marine gastropod mollusk in the family Pyramidellidae, the pyrams and their allies.

Distribution
This species occurs in the following locations:
 Gulf of Mexico
 North West Atlantic

Notes
Additional information regarding this species:
 Distribution: Range: 37.9°N to 27.3°N; 80°W to 75.5°W. Distribution: USA: Virginia, Florida; Florida: East Florida

References

External links
 To Biodiversity Heritage Library (2 publications)
 To Encyclopedia of Life
 To USNM Invertebrate Zoology Mollusca Collection
 To ITIS
 To World Register of Marine Species

toyatani
Gastropods described in 1914